Tahira Syed (in Punjabi and ) (born 1958, Lahore) is a Pakistani ghazal and folk singer. Her repertoire includes folk songs in Urdu, Punjabi, Dogri and Pahari.

Early life
Tahira Syed was born in Lahore to a vocalist Malika Pukhraj and Shabbir Hussain, a Punjabi, government official and writer.

Syed obtained her primary education from the Convent of Jesus and Mary where she passed her Senior Cambridge examinations. She graduated from Lahore College, then studied law at the Punjab University. After obtaining an LLB degree, she enrolled in a Masters Program in English at Kinnaird College for Women, Lahore, but later dropped out of the college.

Syed began singing, at age of 12, to please her mother. After two years of rigorous classical music training by Akhtar Hussain, Syed was instructed in geet and ghazal by her mother. Her final teacher, Nazar Hussain, taught her voice modulation and raggi (singing using the throat).

Music career 
Syed first appeared on air in 1968–1969 on Radio Pakistan, and then on Pakistan Television. "Yeh Alam Shauq Ka Dekha na Jaey", "Chanjar Phabdi Na Mutiar Bina" and "Abhi Tau Main Jawan Houn", written by Pakistani poet Hafeez Jalandhri, are some of her most popular songs. In April 1985, she appeared on the cover of National Geographic magazine. She received the Pakistan Television Lifetime Achievement Award, and the Pride of Performance Award from the President of Pakistan on 23 March 2013. In 1972, she won the Nigar Award for Best Female Playback Singer.

Syed continues to perform at diverse events such as a "ghazal evening" in Dallas, Texas, U.S., a tribute to Faiz Ahmed Faiz in Philadelphia, Pennsylvania, U.S., and at the Faiz International Festival in Lahore.

Personal life 
Syed was married to lawyer Naeem Bukhari for 15 years (1975-1990) before their separation and divorce; they had two children. She is a well-known personality in Pakistan and occasionally speaks publicly at art and literature events.

Awards and recognition

References

External links
 Bridging differences with cultural exchanges

1958 births
20th-century Pakistani women singers
Radio personalities from Lahore
Pakistani ghazal singers
Living people
Pakistani classical singers
Punjabi people
Urdu-language singers
Punjabi women
Urdu playback singers
Nigar Award winners
Pakistani playback singers
Singers from Lahore
Convent of Jesus and Mary, Lahore alumni
Pakistani women singers
Kinnaird College for Women University alumni
Recipients of the Pride of Performance
University of the Punjab alumni
Punjabi-language singers
Women ghazal singers
21st-century Pakistani women singers
PTV Award winners
Pakistani radio personalities